Cavron-Saint-Martin is a commune in the Pas-de-Calais département in the Hauts-de-France region of France.

Geography
Cavron St. Martin is in the valley of the Planquette, a tiny tributary of the Canche river.

Population

Places of interest

 The church of St. Walloy, dating from the fifteenth century.
 A disused watermill, behind the restaurant.
 A café-shop and 'La Planquette' restaurant.
 An estaminet, 'Chès Deux Agaches'. Here one can find reproductions (made by the owner) of traditional wooden pub games that can be played in the pub.

See also
Communes of the Pas-de-Calais department

References

Cavronsaintmartin
Artois